Horaiclavus sysoevi is a species of sea snail, a marine gastropod mollusk in the family Horaiclavidae.

Originally it was classified within the family Drilliidae. Later it was included within the family Turridae.

Description

Distribution
This species occurs in the Northwest Indian Ocean.

References

External links
  Tucker, J.K. 2004 Catalog of recent and fossil turrids (Mollusca: Gastropoda). Zootaxa 682:1-1295.

sysoevi